Marc van Orsouw (born 12 April 1964) is a Dutch former racing cyclist. He rode in eight Grand Tours between 1986 and 1994.

Major results

1983
 1st Tour du Jura
1985
 2nd Ronde van Limburg
1986
 1st Hel van het Mergelland
 1st Gran Premio della Liberazione
1987
 7th Overall Tour du Haut Var
 7th Dwars door België
1988
 4th Tour du Nord-Ouest
1989
 1st Stage 2b Volta a Catalunya (TTT)
 6th Brabantse Pijl
1992
 3rd GP Stad Vilvoorde
 7th Grote Prijs Jef Scherens

References

External links
 

1964 births
Living people
Dutch male cyclists
Sportspeople from Oss
Cyclists from North Brabant
20th-century Dutch people